Abdulah Gegić (19 March 1924 – 21 June 2008) was a Yugoslav and Serbian football manager of Bosniak ethnicity, who also held Turkish citizenship.

Biography
As a player, he played with Metalac Beograd and with Mačva Šabac in the Yugoslav First League.

Gegić began his coaching career as coach of Serbian clubs FK Bor and FK Radnički Niš, and later of the Yugoslav u-21 team, and also the Yugoslavia national football team. He coached Partizan where he reached the Final of the European Champion Clubs' Cup (today known as the UEFA Champions League) in 1966 where he saw a 2–1 defeat against Real Madrid. He was named the second best coach of Europe by France Football magazine. If Gegić had won the final, he would have been named the new coach of Real Madrid.

Gegić then went to Turkey to coach Eskişehirspor, where he became very successful and led the club to many victories. He also coached Beşiktaş (1972–1973), Fenerbahçe (1975–1976) and the Turkish national football team.

Gegić is nicknamed Futbol Profesörü (Football Professor) by the Turkish press. In 1979, he took Turkish nationality and became a citizen of Turkey. He is still an important figure in Turkish football having mentored most of the top Turkish coaches of today such as Fatih Terim, Mustafa Denizli, and Şenol Güneş.

On 4 June 2008, in Novi Sad, the 84-year-old Gegić had a stroke and died 17 days later.

Honours

Managerial
Partizan
European Cup: Runner-up: 1965–66

Fenerbahçe
Spor Toto Cup: 1967

Turkey
RCD Cup: 1969

Eskişehirspor
Turkish Cup: 1970–71
Turkish Super Cup: 1971

Beşiktaş
TSYD Cup: 1973

References

External links
IN MEMORIAM: Abdulah Gegić, MTS Mondo, 21 June 2008
In memoriam: Abdulah Gegić, B92, 22 June 2008

1924 births
2008 deaths
Serbian footballers
Yugoslav footballers
Association football forwards
FK Novi Pazar players
OFK Beograd players
FK Mačva Šabac players
Yugoslav First League players
Yugoslav football managers
Yugoslav expatriate football managers
Serbian football managers
FK Radnički Niš managers
FK Sarajevo managers
FK Partizan managers
Eskişehirspor managers
Fenerbahçe football managers
Beşiktaş J.K. managers
Sportspeople from Novi Pazar
Turkey national football team managers
Bursaspor managers
FK Bor managers
Yugoslav expatriate sportspeople in Turkey
Expatriate football managers in Turkey
Adanaspor managers
Diyarbakırspor managers
Samsunspor managers
Adana Demirspor managers
Turkish people of Serbian descent
Turkish people of Bosniak descent
Serbian Muslims